General Brady may refer to:

Hugh Brady (general) (1768–1851), U.S. Army major general
Patrick Henry Brady (born 1936), U.S. Army major general
Roger A. Brady (born 1946), U.S. Air Force four-star general
Thomas Brady (general) (c. 1752–1827), Irish lieutenant general (feldzeugmeister) in the Austrian army

See also
Attorney General Brady (disambiguation)